The 1923–24 Army Cadets men's ice hockey season was the 21st season of play for the program. The team was coached by Ray Marchand in his 1st season.

Season
Army's hockey team began a tremendous change when Talbot Hunter was replaced by Ray Marchand as head coach. Their new bench boss overhauled the entire style of play for the Cadets and, while the new scheme would eventually pay dividends, the team was a little slow on the uptake. Part of the problem early in the year was the lack of ice resulting from a late winter. Army had just two partial practice sessions before their first game on January 5 and the resulting 3–7 loss was hardly surprising. Army fared much better in their second match, holding a 1–1 tie with Pennsylvania until the last minute of play. After the match with Penn, Stuart Rink was turned into little more than a puddle for a 10-day period and the Cadets were again unable to improve their play. The lack of ice time caused Army to drop their third game of the season to Bates which did not bode well for the remainder of the year.

After games against Amherst and Princeton were cancelled due to a lack of ice, February brought colder temperatures to West Point and Army was able to welcome MIT to Stuart Rink. Army played far better than they had in any of their previous games and dominated the Engineers despite the close score. A week later, a hat-trick by Walter Marinelli gave the Cadets a 3–2 win. Army ran its winning streak to 3 with a strong performance against Union but were then thoroughly beaten by their rivals to the north, the Royal Military College Paladins.

Entering their final weekend of the season, Army had a chance to earn a winning record. That possibility was ended, however, when Williams lost their goaltender Lowes before the match. Army's reserve netminder Lewis was put into the Ephs' cage and the two teams agreed to count the match as an exhibition. Army still had a chance to reach .500 but they would have to get through one of the nation's top teams in Boston College. Another hat-trick from Marinelli gave the Cadets a miraculous lead, which they carried late into the game, but BC managed to tie the score with just a few minutes to play. In the overtime session, the Bostonians overwhelmed Army and scored three times to capture the match and end the Cadets' season on a loss.

Roster

Standings

Schedule and results

|-
!colspan=12 style=";" | Regular Season

References

Army Black Knights men's ice hockey seasons
Army
Army
Army
Army